Fudbalski klub Njegoš is a Serbian football club based in the village of Lovćenac, in the Bačka region, Vojvodina. They currently compete in the fourth tier Vojvodina League North. The club was founded by Montenegrin settlers in 1946, and named in honor of Prince-Bishop Petar II Petrović-Njegoš.

History
The football club was originally founded as Fudbalski klub Sloga (English: Football Club Unity), by Montenegrin settlers to the village of Lovćenac (previously named Sekić) following World War II. The club playing its first game against a squad representing the neighbouring village of Feketić on May Day, 1946 and was officially registered on October 4, 1946. The club changed its name to Fudbalski klub Lovćen (English: Football Club Lovćen) in 1949 and finally to Fudbalski klub Njegoš (English: Football Club Njegoš) following an administrative takeover by local agricultural cooperative "Njegoš" in 1957.

The team competed in the Bačka Topola and Subotica district leagues until achieving promotion to the Vojvodina League for season 1974/75 after a two-leg win over Mladost Apatin. Promotion was short lived though as Njegoš were relegated in their debut season. The club would enter the Vojvodina League on two other occasions for season 1990-91 and 2006-07, only to be relegated on both occasions.

In October 2016 Njegoš hosted Red Star Belgrade in a friendly match to mark the 70th anniversary of the club's founding with the game ending in a 4-0 win for the guests. Njegoš were promoted to the fourth tier Vojvodina League North after topping the PFL Subotica table in season 2019-20.

Crest and colours
The club initially wore a red star (petokraka) on an all white kit during the early Socialist era. Use of the star  dissipated over time though the club retained its white kit, with alternating shorts colour's. The team also wore a kit based on the traditional tricolour flags of both SR Serbia and SR Montenegro at the time. During the 90s Njegoš began adopting a primarily all red outfit and a mainly white away kit which it still retains. Since the late 2000s the team image has been inspired by the Montenegro national football team.

The crest of Njegoš is a bronze edged shield. The upper portion features the club name ФК ЊЕГОШ (English; FK NJEGOŠ) in bronze Serbian Cyrillic on a white background. The interior of the emblem is crimson in which there is a stylised depiction of the Mausoleum of Njegoš on Mount Lovćen in bronze, whilst ЛОВЋЕНАЦ (English; LOVĆENAC) is written in bronze letters above the mausoleum.

Stadium

Stadion "FK Njegoš" is the club's home ground. It is located in north-western Lovćenac on the corner of Blažo Orlandić and Đuro Đaković St. The humble facility features a 582 capacity western terrace, club rooms, and unique cliff side topography.

Supporters and rivalries
Njegoš derives support from the village of Lovćenac, and the broader Montenegrin community in the Bačka region. Traditional rivals include teams from surrounding villages such as FK Egység (Mali Iđoš) and FK Jadran (Feketić). Other club rivalries include OFK Vrbas, FK Crvenka, FK Srbobran and TSC Bačka Topola. Since 2018 Njegoš, alongside neighbouring club FK Jadran have been in official partnership with Serbian SuperLiga club FK Spartak Subotica.

Honours
PFL Subotica (1): 2019-20

Notable players
  Božidar Belojević
  Andrija Kaluđerović
  Radovan Krivokapić
  Savo Pavićević
  Danilo Popivoda
  Zvezdan Terzić

Coaches
  Momčilo Raičević (2019–2021)

References

Njegos Lovcenac
Njegos Lovcenac
1946 establishments in Serbia